

1984

See also 
 1984 in Australia
 1984 in Australian television

References

External links 
 Australian film at the Internet Movie Database

1984
Lists of 1984 films by country or language
Films